Maylu Pena (born 31 July 1998 in Caracas, Venezuela as Maylu Belsai Peña Perez) is a ballet dancer and ballet coach based in Minneapolis, Minnesota. Maylu Pena is a soloist with Continental Ballet Company.  She also acts as the Assistant Director of 5th Position Method.

Early life

Maylu Pena began studying classical ballet at the age of ten at the Teresa Carreño Cultural Complex Academy. She received further training from the Escuela Nacional de Danza (Venezuela). Maylu trained in ENDANZA with Ruta Butviliene, Alexandra De Leon, Rita Dordelly (Rita Dordelly's graduation class) and Alicia Alonso while attending to two of the Cuban National Ballet School festivals programs in Habana, Cuba. Maylu Pena also attended to Joffrey Ballet New York for a summer program on scholarship, Joffrey Ballet Chicago where she had the privilege to get coached by Victoria Vargas and Gelsey Kirkland Academy of Classical Ballet. After graduation, Maylu began classes at the Nuevo Mundo Ballet Company in Caracas until she moved to the United States.

Professional life

Maylu moved to Minnesota, United States in 2011 where she trained, danced and taught for Metropolitan Ballet under the artistic direction of former Russian Prima Ballerina Tatiana Berevova. She joined Continental Ballet Company in 2013 under the direction of Riet Velthuisen. Maylu has danced and toured Minnesota with Continental Ballet performing roles such as Temperament Fairy in Sleeping Beauty, Clara and Flower Queen in The Nutcracker, and Peasant Pas in Giselle, among others; she has performed with St. Paul Ballet and Cities Classical Dance Ensemble. Maylu has guested and choreographed for Metropolitan Ballet and Minneapolis Ballet Dancers.

Additional information

Her favorite pieces to perform include Fall Fairy in Cinderella; Clara, doll and Queen in The Nutcracker and big Swans in Swan Lake.

One of her students, Wynne Wrede, cites Maylu Pena among other wonderful teachers she has had over the years: "Wynne began her dance training at the age of 5 and has had many wonderful teachers over the years, including Maylu Pena, Tatiana Berenova, and Elaine Kudo of the Washington Ballet..."

Since June 2018, Maylu has been teaching BalletFitness for Seniors at The Waters Senior Living in Minneapolis.

On April 2 and May 7 of 2018, Maylu started teaching senior ballet classes at Capital Senior Living Rose Arbor & Wildflower every two weeks. Seniors participating in the ballet class improve balance and coordination, meet personal health goal, and enhance physical and mental vitality.

On Monday, September 10, 2018, Maylu Pena hosted a "Senior Chair Ballet for All!" class for the seniors at Oak Meadows as part of their Wellness Week. "Maylu has been teaching chair ballet to seniors for many years. Her meditation based ballet class helps improve memory, flexibility, helps reduce the risks of falling and strengthens core muscles. All done in the comfort of your chair!"

In May 2022, @maylupena Instagram account had 1,535 followers.

Honors, decorations, awards and distinctions

Received training from Ruta Railaite-Butviliene, Rita Dordelly, Victoria Vargas, Tatiana Berenova and Gelsey Kirkland. 
Vaganova method Diploma - Classical Ballet with a minor in Contemporary Dance - from Escuela Nacional de Ballet (Venezuela)
Bachelors in Science in Nutrition from the University of Minnesota
Awarded Joffrey Ballet New York Year Program Scholarship

Bibliography, References and Notes

Living people
1998 births
Venezuelan ballet dancers
Venezuelan expatriates in the United States